Nuestra Belleza Oaxaca 2012,  was held at the Teatro "Macedonio Alcalá" in Oaxaca, Oaxaca, Oaxaca on June 16, 2012. At the conclusion of the final night of competition, Almudena Villasante from Oaxaca City was crowned the winner. Villasante was crowned by Lupita Jones, National Director of Nuestra Belleza México. Six contestants competed for the title.

Results

Placements

Special Awards

Judges
 Ofelia Correa - Regional Coordinator of Nuestra Belleza México
Marco Flavio Cruz - TV Producer
Roberto González - Doctor
Jordi Avendaño - Photographer

Background Music
Alexander Acha

Contestants

Contestant Notes
Samantha Antonio competed in Nuestra Belleza Oaxaca 2011, but she didn't place.

References

External links
Official Website

Nuestra Belleza México